In Greek mythology, the name Hypsenor (Ancient Greek: Ὑψήνωρ) may refer to:

Hypsenor, a Trojan priest, son of Dolopion, killed by Eurypylus.
Hypsenor, son of Hippasus, fought under Antilochus and was killed by Deiphobus.
Hypsenor, a son of Neleus and Chloris.

Notes

References 

 Homer, The Iliad with an English Translation by A.T. Murray, Ph.D. in two volumes. Cambridge, MA., Harvard University Press; London, William Heinemann, Ltd. 1924. . Online version at the Perseus Digital Library.
 Homer, Homeri Opera in five volumes. Oxford, Oxford University Press. 1920. . Greek text available at the Perseus Digital Library.

Trojans
Achaeans (Homer)
People of the Trojan War